The 1878 Yale Bulldogs football team represented Yale University in the 1878 college football season. The Bulldogs finished with a 4–1–1 record. The team recorded five shutouts and outscored its opponents by a combined total of 7 to 1.

Schedule

Standings

References

Yale
Yale Bulldogs football seasons
Yale Bulldogs football